List of hospitals in South Dakota (U.S. state), grouped by city and sorted by name.

Aberdeen
Avera St. Luke's Hospital 
Dakota Plains Surgical Center
Sanford Aberdeen Medical Center

Armour
Douglas County Memorial Hospital

Bowdle
Bowdle Hospital

Britton
Marshall County Healthcare Center

Brookings
Brookings Health System

Burke
Community Memorial Hospital

Canton
Canton-Inwood Memorial Hospital

Chamberlain
Mid Dakota Medical Center

Clear Lake
Deuel County Memorial Hospital

Custer
Custer Regional Hospital

Dakota Dunes
Siouxland Surgery Center

De Smet
De Smet Memorial Hospital

Deadwood
Black Hills Medical Center
Lead-Deadwood Regional Hospital

Dell Rapids
Avera Dells Area Health Center

Eagle Butte
U. S. Public Health Service Indian Hospital

Eureka
Eureka Community Health Services / Avera Health

Faulkton
Faulkton Area Medical Center

Flandreau

Flandreau Medical Center / Avera Health

Fort Meade
Veterans Affairs Black Hills Health Care System

Freeman
Freeman Regional Health Services

Gettysburg
Gettysburg Memorial Hospital

Gregory
Avera Gregory Healthcare Center

Hot Springs
Fall River Hospital

Huron
Huron Regional Medical Center

Madison
Madison Community Hospital

Martin
Bennett County Hospital and Nursing Home

Milbank
Milbank Area Hospital / Avera Health

Miller
Hand County Memorial Hospital / Avera Health

Mitchell
Avera Queen of Peace Hospital

Mobridge
Mobridge Regional Hospital

Parkston
Avera St. Benedict Health Center

Philip
Hans P. Peterson Memorial Hospital

Pierre
St. Mary's Healthcare Center

Pine Ridge
U. S. Public Health Service Indian Hospital

Platte
Platte Health Center / Avera Health

Rapid City
Black Hills Surgery Center
Black Hills Rehabilitation Hospital
Indian Health Service Hospital
Regional Health Rapid City Hospital 
Same Day Surgery Center

Redfield
Community Memorial Hospital

Rosebud
U. S. Public Health Service Indian Hospital

Scotland
Landmann-Jungman Memorial Hospital

Sioux Falls
Avera Heart Hospital of South Dakota - Sioux Falls
Avera McKennan Hospital & University Health Center - Sioux Falls
Children's Care Hospital and School
Royal C. Johnson Veterans Memorial Hospital
Select Specialty Hospital-Sioux Falls
Sioux Falls Surgical Center
Sanford USD Medical Center

Sisseton
Coteau des Prairies Hospital

Spearfish
Spearfish Regional Hospital
Spearfish Surgery Center

Sturgis
Sturgis Regional Hospital

Tyndall
St. Michael's Hospital

Vermillion
Sanford Vermillion Medical Center

Viborg
Pioneer Memorial Hospital and Health Services

Wagner
Wagner Community Memorial Hospital - Avera

Watertown
Prairie Lakes Hospital & Care Center

Webster
Sanford Webster Medical Center

Wessington Springs
Avera Weskota Memorial Medical Center

Winner
Winner Regional Healthcare Center

Yankton
Avera Sacred Heart Hospital 
Lewis and Clark Specialty Hospital

References

 

South Dakota
 
Hospitals